Asphalt (아스팔트) is a 1964 South Korean film directed by Kim Ki-young.

Synopsis
A revenge melodrama about a criminal whose wife is killed during his arrest. After serving 20 years in prison he attempts to kill the arresting officer's wife out of revenge, but fails and is again imprisoned.

Cast
Kim Jin-kyu
Jang Dong-hee
Ju Jeung-ryu
Lee Dae-yub
Kim Hee-kap
Kim Nan-yeong
Park Am
Kim Ok
Kim Wun-Ha
Na Ae-sim

References

Bibliography

External links

1960s Korean-language films
Films directed by Kim Ki-young
South Korean crime thriller films
1960s crime thriller films